Kees Stoop (19 March 1929 in Werkendam  16 February 2019) was a Dutch painter, illustrator and etcher.

Born in Werkendam, he studied at the Royal Academy of Fine Arts and the Higher Institute for Fine Arts in Antwerp in the 1950s where Professor Jos Hendrickx influenced the young artist greatly. Further inspiration was found in the works of Constant Permeke and Gustave De Smet. He lived and worked in Holten since the 1960s. Despite rarely exhibiting, his work has received national recognition. 192 of his etchings and drawings are in the collection of the Rijksprentenkabinet Amsterdam, Rijksmuseum Twenthe (Enschede) and Museum More (Gorsel) have acquired several works.

Museum de Weem (Westeremden) of renown painter Henk Helmantel has an impressive collection.

In 2021 the book "Kees Stoop, Leven en Werk" (Live and work) was published.

References

External links 

 Official website

1929 births
2019 deaths
20th-century Dutch painters
Dutch male painters
People from Werkendam
20th-century Dutch male artists